Red Heart was a joint venture between the Seven Network and Granada PLC between c. 1999 and 2001. It brought together all of its Australian parents' TV production resources, except those used for Seven's news and soaps.

One theory states that Granada was looking to buy Seven's core, through it eventually owning 100% of Red Heart. Red Heart may have also eventually controlled Seven's news and soaps. This was a time when "content is king" was a popular idea.

Australia's Broadcasting Services Act 1992 disallows foreign entities owning more than 15% of any TV station licence holder, but owning a company that provides a station with 100% of its content for 99% of its income is fine. (CanWest found another way around the law to own a majority stake of Network Ten).

However, Granada decided to pull out of Red Heart when it realised it could make more money selling Australian programs to other Australian broadcasters than it would just supplying Seven. It has been rare to see Australian-made Granada programs on the screen.

References

 https://books.google.com.au/books?id=NUXIAgAAQBAJ&pg=PA186&lpg=PA186&dq=%22Red+Heart%22+granada+-yarn&source=bl&ots=1FHZbI7BKL&sig=qJs3-ZuMLSXDoZ9biezOkJOcwG8&hl=en&sa=X&ved=0ahUKEwjhxp3HsJ7bAhWEgrwKHSoVDcgQ6AEIVTAL#v=onepage&q=%22Red%20Heart%22%20granada%20-yarn&f=false
 https://www.broadcastnow.co.uk/special-mip-tv-granada-shuts-red-heart-after-clash/1173431.article
 http://www.c21media.net/granada-walks-away-from-red-heart/
 https://www.theguardian.com/media/2001/apr/06/citynews.broadcasting
 https://www.smh.com.au/news/business/vizard-finally-ends-long-time-at-the-top/2005/07/05/1120329446704.html
 https://variety.com/2008/scene/news/itv-s-paul-jackson-exits-1117992326/

Joint ventures
Television production companies of Australia